John Whiteheare (sometimes Whythere) was the second Dean of Bristol.

Whiteheare was installed on 1 Ocvtober 1451."Cathedral Antiquities: Historical and descriptive Accounts, with 311 illustrations of the following English Cathedrals, Volume 5" Britton, J. p67: London, M.A. Nattali, 1836</ref>

References

Deans of Bristol